Robin Cole (born September 11, 1955) is a former professional American football player. He was the seventh of ten children born to Obediah and Georgia Mae Cole. He attended high school at Compton High, graduating in 1973. He furthered his education at the University of New Mexico where he became an All American and the first person to be a first round draft pick out of the University. He was drafted by the Pittsburgh Steelers, the 21st pick in the first round of the draft. At Pittsburgh, he was a part of the Steel Curtain defense, replacing Andy Russell as right outside linebacker. He played linebacker and defensive end for twelve seasons for the Pittsburgh Steelers. He played in two Super Bowls - Super Bowl XIII and Super Bowl XIV. Mr. Cole was in the starting lineup in Super Bowl XIV in 1980 and was elected to the Pro Bowl in 1984. He was runner up for MVP in Super Bowl XIV. He played one season, 1988, with the New York Jets.

Mr. Cole's presentations focus on issues important to corporate groups, business sales teams, sports teams, churches, schools and prisons. He has been a keynote speaker and emcee for many events. Mr. Cole is an entrepreneur and trained at the Ford Motor Institute to be a dealer. In addition, he has served on several charitable boards, including the American Heart Association, The March of Dimes, Big Brothers/Big Sisters and others. He is a lifetime member of the NAACP.

Cole is the co-founder and president of the Robin Cole Foundation. He is the father of five children and grandfather of six. He lives in Tampa, Florida with his wife, Judith, and their daughter, Mya.

References

External links
Just Sports Stats

Players of American football from Los Angeles
American football linebackers
New Mexico Lobos football players
Pittsburgh Steelers players
New York Jets players
American Conference Pro Bowl players
1955 births
Living people
Compton High School alumni